List of awards and nominations received by Plan B.

ASCAP Awards

|-
| 2011
| Plan B
| Vanguard Award
|

BET Hip Hop Awards
The BET Hip Hop Awards are an annual awards show, airing on BET, showcasing hip hop performers, producers and music video directors. Plan B has received one nomination for Best UK Artist in 2006.

|-
| 2006
| Plan B
| Best UK Artist
|

BRIT Awards

|-
| rowspan="3"| 2011
| Plan B
| British Male Solo Artist
| 
|-
| The Defamation of Strickland Banks
| British Album
| 
|-
| "She Said"
| British Single
| 
|-
| rowspan="2"| 2013
| Plan B
| Best Male Solo Artist
| 
|-
| Ill Manors
| MasterCard British Album of the Year
|

British Independent Film Awards

|-
| rowspan="2"| 2012
| Ben Drew
| The Douglas Hickox Award (Directorial Debut)
| 
|-
| Ill Manors
| Best Achievement in Production
| 
|-

BT Digital Music Awards
Plan B has received two nominations for Best Male Artist and Best Song for "She Said" in 2010.

|-
| rowspan="2"| 2010
| Plan B
| Best Male Artist
| 
|-
| "She Said"
| Best Song
| 
|-
| 2011
| Plan B
| Best Male Artist
|

Ivor Novello Awards

|-
| rowspan="3"| 2011
| Ben Drew
| Songwriter of the Year
| 
|-
| The Defamation of Strickland Banks
| Album Award
| 
|-
| "She Said"
| Most Performed Work
|

Mercury Prize

|-
| rowspan="1"| 2012
| rowspan="1"| Ill Manors
| Album of the Year
|

MOBO Awards
The MOBO Awards was established in 1996 by Kanya King and Andy Ruffell to recognise and celebrate artists of any race or nationality performing black music. Plan B was nominated for Best UK Male in 2006, Best UK Act and Best Album for The Defamation of Strickland Banlks in 2010 and won Best UK R&B/Soul in 2010.

|-
| rowspan="2"| 2006
| rowspan="2"| Plan B
| Best Newcomer
| 
|-
| Best UK Male
| 
|-
| rowspan="3"| 2010
| rowspan="2"| Plan B
| Best UK Act
| 
|-
| Best UK R&B/Soul Act
| 
|-
| The Defamation of Strickland Banks
| Best Album
| 
|-
| rowspan="5"| 2012
| rowspan="2"| Plan B
| Best UK Male
| 
|-
| Best UK Hip Hop/Grime Act
| 
|-
| Ill Manors
| Best Album
| 
|-
| rowspan="2"| "Ill Manors"
| Best Song
| 
|-
| Best Video
| 
|-

MTV Europe Music Awards
The MTV Europe Music Awards (EMAs) were established in 1994 by MTV Networks Europe to celebrate the most popular music videos in Europe. Plan B was nominated twice in 2010 for Best New Act and Best Video for "Prayin'".

|-
| rowspan="2"| 2010
| Plan B
| Best New Act
| 
|-
| "Prayin'"
| Best Video
|

The Music Producers Guild Awards
The Music Producers Guild Awards are presented annually by the Music Producers Guild.

|-
| rowspan="1"| 2011
| rowspan="1"| "She Said"
| UK Single of the Year 2010
|

NME Awards

|-
| 2011
| "Stay Too Long"
| Best Dancefloor Filler
|

NRJ Music Awards
The NRJ Music Awards, created in 2000 by the radio station NRJ in partnership with the television network TF1 takes place every year in mid-January at Cannes (PACA, France) as the opening of MIDEM (Marché international de l'édition musicale). Plan B was nominated twice in 2011 for International Revelation of the Year and Hit of the Year for "She Said".

|-
| rowspan="2"| 2011 
| Plan B
| International Revelation of the Year
| 
|-
| "She Said"
| Hit of the Year
| 
|-

Q Awards
The Q Awards are the UK's annual music awards run by the music magazine Q. Plan B won the award for Breakthrough Artist in 2010, as well as being nominated for Best Male Artist, Best Album for The Defamation of Strickland Banks and Best Video for "End Credits" with Chase & Status. In 2012, "Ill Manors" won the award for Best Track.

|-
| rowspan="4"| 2010
| rowspan="2"| Plan B
| Best Male Artist
| 
|-
| Breakthrough Artist
| 
|-
| The Defamation of Strickland Banks
| Best Album
| 
|-
| "End Credits" (with Chase & Status)
| Best Video
| 
|-
| 2012
| "Ill Manors"
| Best Track
| 
|-

Radio 1's Teen Awards

|-
| 2010
| The Defamation of Strickland Banks
| Best Album
| 
|-

South Bank Sky Arts Awards

|-
| 2011
| The Defamation of Strickland Banks
| Pop Music
| 
|-

UK Festival Awards
The UK Festival Awards are awarded annually, with various categories for all aspects of festivals that have taken place in the UK, and one category for European festivals. Plan B was nominated for Best Breakthrough Artist in 2010.

|-
| 2010
| Plan B
| Best Breakthrough Artist
| 
|-

UK Music Video Awards
The UK Music Video Awards is a British yearly award ceremony, which has taken place in October in London since 2008. Plan B's music videos received a total of eleven nominations in 2010, winning four awards for Best Art Direction in a Video and Best Pop Video for "Prayin" and Best Cinematography in a Video and Best Styling in a Video for "Stay Too Long".

|-
| rowspan="11"| 2010
| rowspan="5"| "Prayin'"
| Best Art Direction in a Video
| 
|-
| Best Cinematography in a Video
| 
|-
| Best Editing in a Video
| 
|-
| Best Pop Video 
| 
|-
| Best Styling in a Video
| 
|-
| "She Said"
| Best Pop Video
| 
|-
| rowspan="5"| "Stay Too Long"
| Best Cinematography in a Video
| 
|-
| Best Editing in a Video
| 
|-
| Best Styling in a Video
| 
|-
| Best Telecine in a Video
| 
|-
| Best Urban Video
| 
|-
| rowspan="4"| 2011
| The Defamation of Strickland Banks
| Best Music Ad
| 
|-
| "Love Goes Down"
| Best Telecine in a Video
| 
|-
| rowspan="2"| "The Recluse"
| Best Art Direction in a Video
| 
|-
| Best Telecine in a Video
| 
|-
| rowspan="4"| 2012
| rowspan="2"| "Ill Manors"
| Best Urban Video
| 
|-
| Best Editing in a Video
| 
|-

Urban Music Awards
The Urban Music Awards is a hip hop, R&B, dance and soul music awards ceremony launched in 2003 and now held in six countries annually. Plan B received one nomination for Best Album for The Defamation of Strickland Banks.

|-
| 2010
| The Defamation of Strickland Banks
| Best Album
| 
|-
| rowspan="2"| 2012
| Plan B
| Best Hip Hop Act
| 
|-
| Ill Manors
| Best Album
| 
|-

Virgin Media Music Awards
Plan B received won the award for Best Solo Male and received a Best Album nomination for The Defamation of Strickland Banks in 2011.

|-
| rowspan="2"| 2011
| Plan B
| Best Solo Male
| 
|-
| The Defamation of Strickland Banks
| Best Album
| 
|-

Other awards
 BBC Sound of 2006 – 4th place (2006)
 Screen International Stars of Tomorrow (2009)
 Festival du Film Britannique de Dinard – Best Photography award for Ill Manors (2012)
 Festival du Film Britannique de Dinard – Heartbeat Award for Ill Manors (2012)
 Artist and Manager Awards – Artist of the Year (2012)

References

Plan B
Awards and nominations
British music-related lists